Just Married is a 2003 American romantic comedy film directed by Shawn Levy, written by Sam Harper, and stars Ashton Kutcher and Brittany Murphy. Produced by Robert Simonds, the film was successful at the box office despite generally negative critical reviews.

Plot
The film opens with Tom and Sarah in the airport, then flashes back from the moment they met up to the present.

Working-class Tom Leezak and upper-class Sarah McNerney meet up when Tom accidentally hits Sarah with a football on the beach. A few months later, despite opposition from Sarah's rich family, they get married. Each has kept one secret from the other: Tom doesn't tell her that he accidentally killed her dog and Sarah doesn't tell him that she slept with Peter Prentiss, a childhood family friend, after they started dating.

Flying to Europe for their honeymoon, they attempt to consummate their marriage by joining the mile high club, but fail rather publicly. Arriving at their classy hotel at the foot of the Alps they find that Peter has sent them a bottle of cognac "with love", while Tom's friend Kyle has sent them a Thunderstick A-200 sex toy.

When Tom tries to force the toy's American plug into the European outlet, he shuts down the entire village's electricity. The newlyweds leave the hotel after Tom has a heated argument with the hotel owner and pays a large bill to repair the power. While trying to find another hotel they crash their mini car into a snowbank, stuck until daylight and once again unable to consummate their marriage.

They make their way to Venice, staying at a pensione recommended by Tom's father. It turns out to be a wreck, and they soon check out after a cockroach crawls over Tom when they try to have sex.

The couple secure a luxurious Venetian hotel with the grudging financial help of Sarah's father. They go sightseeing, but Tom quickly gets bored and abandons her to watch sports in a bar. Sarah runs into Peter, who is staying at their hotel on business. This prompts her to initiate a conversation with Tom in which they reveal their secrets about her dog's death and Peter. They each storm out of the hotel and go their separate ways: he going back to the bar, where he meets American tourist Wendy, and she going sightseeing, where Peter follows her.

Wendy flirts and dances with Tom, who escapes through a bathroom window when he realizes she wants to have sex with him. He returns to the hotel, learning that Sarah has gone out with Peter for the evening. Accosted by Wendy, he finds himself tricked into walking her to his hotel room, where she rips off her top before Tom blurts out that he's on his honeymoon, upon which she finally leaves.

Sarah gets drunk so Peter takes her back to the hotel. When he kisses her at the entrance, she slaps him, reminding him that she's on her honeymoon. Tom sees the kiss from the balcony but not the slap. When he confronts her in their room, Sarah finds Wendy's bra. Peter bursts in to ask her to run away with him to Seattle, leading to a fight that lands Tom and Sarah in jail – still without consummating their marriage. Peter bails them out and the couple angrily decide to go home to Los Angeles, returning to the opening moments of the film.

Sarah has moved out and Tom wants to get back with her. Receiving advice from his father, he attempts to see her at her family's estate, but is unsuccessful trying to ram the gate. However, Sarah opens it herself after seeing Tom make a romantic speech to the camera and they rush together to proclaim their love for each other. Sarah's family finally accepts Tom and Sarah's relationship.

Cast
 Ashton Kutcher as Tom Leezak 
 Brittany Murphy as Sarah McNerney 
 Christian Kane as Peter Prentiss 
 David Moscow as Kyle 
 Monet Mazur as Lauren 
 David Rasche as Mr. McNerney 
 Veronica Cartwright as Mrs. McNerney / Pussy
 Thad Luckinbill as Willie McNerney 
 Taran Killam as Dickie McNerney 
 Raymond J. Barry as Mr. Leezak 
 George Gaynes as Father Robert 
  Alex Thomas as Fred
 Valeria Andrews as Wendy

Reception

Box office
Just Married was successful at the box office. On a modest budget of $18 million, the film went on to gross $56,127,162 domestically and earned an additional $45,437,773 in foreign box office receipts, giving it a total worldwide gross of $101,564,935.

Critical response
Just Married was released to generally negative critical reviews. On Rotten Tomatoes, it has a 20% approval rating based on 106 reviews, and the website's consensus states: "Just Marrieds plot is predictable, and the overdone pratfalls get tiresome." On Metacritic, the film has a score of 28 out of 100 based on reviews from 27 critics, indicating "generally unfavorable reviews". Roger Ebert gave the film  stars out of 4, calling it a dumb sitcom.

Awards
The film earned three nominations at the 24th Golden Raspberry Awards including Worst Actor for Ashton Kutcher (also for Cheaper by the Dozen and My Boss's Daughter), Worst Supporting Actress for Brittany Murphy and Worst Screen Couple for both Kutcher and Murphy (also for My Boss's Daughter with Tara Reid), but failed to win in each of these categories, losing to Ben Affleck (Daredevil, Gigli and Paycheck), Demi Moore (Charlie's Angels: Full Throttle) and both Affleck and Jennifer Lopez (Gigli) respectively.

References

External links
 
 
 

2000s French-language films
2000s German-language films
2000s Italian-language films
2000s American films
20th Century Fox films
2003 romantic comedy films
2003 films
American romantic comedy films
2000s English-language films
Films about honeymoon
Films about weddings
Films directed by Shawn Levy
Films scored by Christophe Beck
Films set in the 1990s
Films set in Los Angeles
Films set in Venice
Films shot in Austria
Films shot in Los Angeles
Films shot in Venice